Prádanos de Bureba is a municipality and town located in the province of Burgos, Castile and León, Spain. According to the 2004 census (INE), the municipality has a population of 59 inhabitants.

References

Pedro CARASA, Historia de Prádanos de Bureba. Valladolid, 2000.

Municipalities in the Province of Burgos